KAGS may refer to:

 KAGS-LD, a low-power television station (channel 23) licensed to Bryan, Texas, United States
 Augusta Regional Airport (ICAO code KAGS)